Memoware is a term originally coined in 1996 for data formatted for the Memopad application that was shipped with the original U.S. Robotics Pilot (now Palm) Personal Digital Assistant. The MemoWare website  was started shortly afterward by Craig Froehle as a central repository for memoware, and now hosts thousands of documents (in various formats) for Palm OS devices and other handhelds.

History 

The idea and the name came out of discussions on a Pilot-related email list (managed by Tracy R. Reed) in August and September 1996.  The term was probably coined by Bill Raynor in an email of 30 Aug 1996, wherein he said: "I've made up a number of tables of statistical distributions ... for my own use. Is this a category that the list would like to see circulated? (call it memoware?)".  He emailed this list on 7 September in an email with the subject line: Pilot: Memoware - statistical tables".

On 12 September Jeffrey Macko wrote, on the subject of maintaining grocery lists on the Pilot: "I'm half tempted to start a pilot site for small useful databases." and Craig Froehle replied "I think that if everybody mailed you their lists of useful stuff, and you put them on a web page for us to copy-n-paste into the Pilot desktop PIM, that'd be real handy."

The following day, a list-member called QuZaX reported that he was working on early content, including weights and measures, the Periodic table, and other elements.  On 14 September QuZax reminded the list that the data tables would not be a program. "They will just be in memoformat. I just used tabs to make them easy to read and so they would line up nicely."

On the following Tuesday (17 September), Froehle announced that he had posted some memos on his website on a server at the University of Cincinnati.  He wrote: "Due to overwhelming demand (approx. 15 requests an hour all yesterday and today, so far), I've put up these memos on my website.  If you've no access to the WWW or for some other reason, just can't figure out how to get this text onto your PC, email me direct and I'll mail them to you.   If you want me to, I can put up your useful Memowarez(tm) if you email them to me.  Maybe this can start to be a big repository of pre-formatted Pilot data..."

Many list-members created Memoware over the next days and months, notably Mark Carden (periodic table of elements, international data), Jon Flemming (US Presidents), John Komdat (US States), Bill Raynor (statistical tables, Quake video game cheats), Bradley Batt (sports results), and others.

Craig's "memoware" database grew rapidly, as he predicted, moving to the domain www.memoware.com in July 1997 and reaching 300 documents a few months later.  He then continued adding documents and e-books, mostly donated by users, in various new mobile formats developed for Palm OS and other handhelds, including Doc and TomeRaider.  By late 2001, MemoWare was serving over half a million individual users and nearly a million documents per month. In December, 2001, Craig Froehle sold MemoWare to Handmark Software,.  MemoWare was the oldest continuously operating website providing content specially formatted for Palm OS devices and other handhelds until Handmark ceased operating the site in September, 2014.

References

Personal digital assistant software